Eucorydia aenea is a species of cockroach in the Corydiidae family. It is found in Asia.

Subspecies
The species is divided into the following subspecies:

 Eucorydia aenea aenea (Brunner von Wattenwyl, 1865)
 Eucorydia aenea dasytoides (Walker, F., 1868)
 Eucorydia aenea plagiata (Walker, F., 1868)

External links
 
 Eucorydia aenea at insectoid.info

Insects described in 1963
Cockroaches